The Jeep Tornado engine was the first post-World War II U.S.-designed mass-produced overhead cam (OHC) automobile engine. The  straight-six was introduced in mid-year 1962, and replaced the flathead "6-226" Willys Super Hurricane that was in use since 1954.

The Tornado engine was also manufactured in Argentina by Industrias Kaiser Argentina (IKA) from 1965 until 1973.

History
The development of a new engine for Kaiser Jeep for an entirely new vehicle began under Chief Engineer, A.C. "Sammy" Sampietro, in the late-1950s. Sampietro worked under Donald Healey in Europe and focused on improving power output through better engine breathing. The single overhead cam design was combined with hemispheric combustion chambers. Mass production of the new engine began in 1962.

The Jeep Tornado engine was introduced in the Willys Jeep Wagon and truck models. Six-cylinder versions built after 3 May 1962, received the 230 OHC "Tornado" engine, replacing the 226 L-head "Super Hurricane" I6. It was made the standard engine in the completely new Jeep Wagoneer station wagons (today called SUV) and Jeep Gladiator pickup trucks that began production in fall 1962 for the 1963 model year.

The Tornado was the only U.S.-built overhead-cam engine in mass production at that time. The new engine was designed for robust, heavy-duty performance with maximum efficiency. Its excellent fuel economy was proven in tests with the Tornado-OHC engine having the lowest specific fuel consumption of all production gasoline engines on the market.

Design
The Tornado, like most Jeep engines, was undersquare for better low-speed torque. It had a  bore with a  stroke. The standard version had an 8.5:1 compression ratio. The engine's actual torque curve indicated achieving the 210 pounds-feet rating before 1000 rpm and then continuing at that level to approximately 3700 rpm.

These were "high-efficiency" engines with a conservatively rated power output.

Unique features of the design included the camshaft that only had six lobes. One lobe operated both the intake and exhaust valves for each cylinder. This made engineering cam profiles more difficult than conventional two lobes per cylinder (one per valve) designs, but allowed the valves to be better arranged for the cross-flow head. Valves were directly opposite their respective ports, and ports were short with wide radius turns. This was one of the initial applications of this hardening process by an engine manufacturer. The silent-type "morse chain" was also special because it was covered with chilled cast iron for long life and compatibility with the cam lobes. Additionally, many of the parts on the engine were made of aluminum, including the front cover, water pump, valve cover, and intake manifold, thus making it weigh , or about  lighter compared to the previous "6-226" Super Hurricane engine.

The new engine's overhead camshaft design was only one of the advanced features offered for the first time in a U.S.-designed and mass-produced engine. The Tornado was a good engine; unfortunately, it was complex (by 1960s standards) and was discontinued in civilian vehicles in the U.S. in 1965. Initial production engines had problems with oil leaks and consumption. Although an easy fix under warranty and then in later production, because owners did not check the oil level until it was too late, engine failures were reported and thus negative opinions about the new engine.

The engine continued to be used in military versions of the Jeep pickup, the M-715, and the M-725, until 1969. These engines had block-mounted motor mounts, rather than the front cover mounts that were a cause of oil leaks on the civilian versions.

Road tests of the new Jeep Wagoneer by Car Life magazine described the OHC six as "commendably smooth and quiet." The engine accelerated the four-wheel-drive full-size station wagon (the SUV designation was not yet known) with an automatic transmission from 0 to 60 mph in 15.9 seconds.

Production

Production of this engine continued in Argentina by Industrias Kaiser Argentina (IKA) after 1965. The OHC engine was used in a variety of Jeep vehicles as well as American Motors Corporation (AMC) passenger cars that were assembled under license. The engine became best known for powering the IKA-Renault Torino, a hybrid version of the AMC Rambler American and Rambler Classic having unique styled front and rear body parts that were built in Argentina from 1966 through 1981. 

The IKA Torino and the OHC engine achieved auto racing success including international recognition in the 1969 Nürburgring 84-hour endurance race. However, it placed third overall due to penalty points.

The engine name was changed to "Torino" to match the car in 1973. It also received a major block and crankshaft refinement that year — seven main bearings instead of the original four as well as a new cylinder head. Industrias Kaiser Argentina was eventually bought out by Renault, and in 1975, the "IKA" name was dropped and it became "Renault Argentina". The Torino, Jeeps, and AMC cars, as well as the Tornado engine, continued to receive upgrades over the years.

This was achieved by a new cylinder head which improved the intake and exhaust ducts. Also adopted was a new camshaft, a new exhaust manifold of a 3-1/3-1 type, two 2-inch diameter exhaust pipes, as well as three Weber DCOE 45-45 side-draft carburetors. 

The Torino and the Jeep Tornado engine continued production through 1982. It was marketed as the "Tornado Jet", and later as the "Tornado Interceptor", in AMC design automobiles built by IKA. From 1976 until 1982, they were the only non-Renault–designed cars and engines built by the French company.

Applications
The Jeep Tornado engine was used in the following vehicles:
 Willys Jeep Truck 1962-1965
 Willys Jeep Wagon 1962-1965
 Jeep Gladiator 1963 and 1964
 Jeep Wagoneer 1963 and 1964
 Kaiser Jeep M715 1963-1969 (military only)
 Kaiser Jeep M725 1963-1969 (military only)
 Renault Torino, also known as IKA Torino, 1966–1973
 by Industrias Kaiser Argentina and Renault Argentina, in Jeep utility vehicles, the Rambler Classic and Ambassador passenger cars, from 1965 until 1973

References

External links 

Piston engines
Straight-six engines
Tornado
1962 introductions
Gasoline engines by model